David Peleg is an Israeli computer scientist. He is a professor at the Weizmann Institute of Science, holding the Norman D. Cohen Professorial Chair of Computer Sciences, and the present dean of the Faculty of Mathematics and Computer Science in Weizmann Institute.
 His main research interests are algorithms, computer networks, and distributed computing. Many of his papers deal with a combination of all three.

He received his Ph.D. from the Weizmann Institute under the supervision of David Harel. He has published numerous papers and a book, chaired leading conferences in computer science, and is an editor of several scientific journals.

Awards and honors
In 2008, he was awarded the Edsger W. Dijkstra Prize in Distributed Computing along with Baruch Awerbuch for their 1990 paper “Sparse partitions.”

In 2011, he won the SIROCCO Prize for Innovation in Distributed Computing, awarded annually at the SIROCCO conference.

In 2017 he became a Fellow of the Association for Computing Machinery.

Since 2020, Peleg is editor-in-chief of the journal Information and Computation.

Selected publications

. Dijkstra Prize 2008.

Notes

References
 David Peleg's home page.

Living people
Israeli computer scientists
Theoretical computer scientists
Researchers in distributed computing
Academic staff of Weizmann Institute of Science
Dijkstra Prize laureates
Fellows of the Association for Computing Machinery
Year of birth missing (living people)